Loving You a Thousand Times (lit. "I Love You Ten Million Times") is a South Korean television series starring Lee Soo-kyung, Jung Gyu-woon, Ko Eun-mi, Ryu Jin and Lee Si-young. It aired on SBS from August 29, 2009 to March 7, 2010 on Saturdays and Sundays at 20:50 for 55 episodes.

Cast

Main characters
Lee Soo-kyung as Go Eun-nim 
Jung Gyu-woon as Baek Kang-ho 
Ko Eun-mi as Lee Sun-young 
Ryu Jin as Baek Sae-hoon

Supporting characters
Go family
Kil Yong-woo as Go In-duk
Lee Mi-young as Park Ae-rang
Park Soo-jin as Oh Nan-jung
Lee Joo-shil as Choi Shim-duk
Baek Jin-hee as Go Eun-jung

Baek family
No Young-kook as Baek Il
Lee Hwi-hyang as Son Hyang-sook
Sa Mi-ja as Ji Ok-sun 
Lee Di-el as Baek Yoo-bin

Lee family
Kim Chung as Kim Chung-ja
Bang Eun-hee as Yoon So-wol
Kim Hee-chul as Lee Chul

Extended cast
Lee Si-young as Hong Yeon-hee 
Kwon Eun-ah as So Geum-ja
Kim Jin-soo as PD Bong
Jin Ye-sol as Park Soo-jung
Park Young-ji as President Park
Min Ji-oh

See also
Seoul Broadcasting System
List of South Korean television series

References

External links
Loving You a Thousand Times official SBS website 

 Loving You a Thousand Times at GnG Production

Seoul Broadcasting System television dramas
2009 South Korean television series debuts
2010 South Korean television series endings
Korean-language television shows
South Korean romance television series
South Korean melodrama television series